is a Japanese voice actor from Chiba Prefecture who is affiliated with Arts Vision. He is known for his roles as Junichi Aizawa in Handa-kun, Aki Kashii in Dynamic Chord, Yūta Hibiki in SSSS.Gridman, and Takuma Akutsu in Val × Love.

Filmography

Anime
2013
Chronicles of the Going Home Club as Lloyd Andō (episodes 8 and 9)

2015
Go! Princess PreCure as Tennis club member
Food Wars!: Shokugeki no Soma as Schoolboy B (episode 19)
Aoharu × Machinegun as Gamer
Chivalry of a Failed Knight as Student (episode 4)
Star-Myu as Student

2016
The Disastrous Life of Saiki K. as Baseball boy A (episode 21)
Cheer Boys!! as Daichi Norita
Handa-kun as Junichi Aizawa
Dynamic Chord as Aki "Knight" Kashii

2017
The Saga of Tanya the Evil as Klein Balhelm (episode 5)
Fuuka as Schoolboy (episode 2)
Interviews with Monster Girls as Schoolboy (episode 1)
Tsuki ga Kirei as Shō Nagahara
Idolish7 as Haruka Isumi

2018
SSSS.Gridman as Yūta Hibiki

2019
O Maidens in Your Savage Season as Shun Amagiri
Val × Love as Takuma Akutsu

2020
Darwin's Game as Hamada
Digimon Survive as Shuuji Kayama
Carnelian Blood as Byakuya Amemiya

2021
Tokyo Revengers as Takuya Yamamoto
IDOLiSH7: Third Season as Haruka Isumi
Deep Insanity: The Lost Child as Lawrence Larry Jackson
Tsukipro the Animation 2 as Seiya

2022
On Air Dekinai! as Chief AD Yokoyama
3-byo Ato, Yajū.: Gōkon de Suma ni Ita Kare wa Midara na Nikushoku Deshita as Yūto Azusawa (on-air version)
Shoot! Goal to the Future as Tōya Nakano
Vermeil in Gold as Alto Goldfield
The Little Lies We All Tell as Hanzō

2023
Tsurune: The Linking Shot as Tōma Higuchi
Chained Soldier as Yūki Wakura

Anime films
2022
Toku Touken Ranbu: Hanamaru ~Setsugetsuka~ as Kotegiri Gou
2023
Gridman Universe as Yūta Hibiki

Video games 
2021
 Gate of Nightmares as Azel

2022
Digimon Survive as Shuuji Kayama

2023
Synduality as Alba Kuze

References

External links
Official agency profile 

1996 births
Arts Vision voice actors
Living people
Japanese male voice actors
Male voice actors from Chiba Prefecture